Austen is surname deriving from the Latin Augustine, and first used around the 13th century.

Notable people with the surname
Abigail Austen (born 1964), British Army officer
Alice Austen (1866–1952), American photographer
Augusta Amherst Austen (1827–1877), British composer
Bob Austen (1914–1999), Australian rules footballer
Cassandra Austen (1773–1845), English painter
Cecil Austen (1918–2017), Australian cricketer
Charles Austen (1779–1852), English admiral
Chuck Austen, American  writer
Col Austen (1920–1995), Australian rules footballer and coach
Dale Austen (1910–?), New Zealand actress
David Austen, English cricketer
Don Austen (born 1958), English puppeteer
Edmund Godwin Austen (1854–1932), English cricketer
Edward Austen (1820–1908), English cricketer
Eric Austen (1922–1999), English designer
Ernest Austen (1900–1983), Australian cricketer
Ernest Edward Austen (1867–1938), English entomologist
Ernie Austen (1891–1985), Australian racewalker
Francis Austen (1774–1865), English admiral
Geoff Austen (born 1953), Australian rules footballer
George Austen (disambiguation), multiple people
Henry Austen (disambiguation), multiple people
Howard Austen (1929–2003), American social figure
James Austen (1765–1819), English clergyman
Jane Austen (1775–1817), English novelist
Joe Austen, British artist
John Austen (disambiguation), multiple people
Katherine Austen (1629–1683), British poet
Louie Austen (born 1946), Austrian musician
Margaret Austen (born 1947), English diver
Michael Austen (born 1964), South African cricketer
Patrick Austen (born 1933), British field hockey player
Ralph Austen (1612–1676), English author
Robert Austen (disambiguation), multiple people
Siobhan Austen, Australian economist
Stephen Austen, Australian archer
Thomas Austen (1775–1859), British soldier and politician
Tom Austen (born 1988), English actor
W. H. Austen (1878–1956), British railway engineer
Winifred Austen (1876–1964), English illustrator

Fictional characters
Kate Austen, in the television series Lost

Technology 

 Austen submachine gun, an Australian submachine gun

Notes

English-language surnames
Surnames from given names